Koringberg is a settlement in West Coast District Municipality in the Western Cape province of South Africa.

Village 118 km north-north-east of Cape Town and 17 km north of Moorreesburg. Founded at Warren's Camp in 1923, it was thus named because it is situated in a wheat growing area. The name is Afrikaans and means ‘wheat mountain’.

References

Populated places in the Swartland Local Municipality
Populated places established in 1923